Eugenio Domingo Solans (26 November 1945 in Barcelona – 9 November 2004) was a Spanish economist who served as a member of the Executive Board of the European Central Bank from 1998 to 2004. In 2006 he was awarded posthumously the Grand Cross of  the Order of Isabella the Catholic.

1945 births
2004 deaths
Executive Board of the European Central Bank members
Knights Grand Cross of the Order of Isabella the Catholic
Spanish economists